The Roman Catholic Diocese of Fada N'Gourma is a diocese located in the city of Fada N’Gourma in the Ecclesiastical province of Koupéla in Burkina Faso.

History
 February 12, 1959: Established as Apostolic Prefecture of Fada N’Gourma from the Apostolic Prefecture of Niamey in Niger
 June 16, 1964: Promoted as Diocese of Fada N’Gourma

Special churches
The cathedral is the Cathédrale Saint Joseph in Fada N’Gourma.

Persecution 
The Minor Seminary of Saint Kisito de Bougui was attacked by Jihadists on the night of February 10. No lives were lost, but severe material damage was reported. The attackers burned two dormitories, a classroom, and a vehicle. Another vehicle was stolen, according to charity Aid to the Church in Need. The seminary had to be moved to Fadi N'Gourma for safety reasons. In July 2022 the diocese claimed that over 90% of the villages were no longer accessible, due to the threat of Islamic terrorism, which has worsened since it began in 2005.

Leadership, in reverse chronological order
 Bishops of Fada N'Gourma (Roman rite)
 Bishop Pierre Claver Malgo (since February 11, 2012)
 Bishop Paul Ouédraogo (January 24, 1997  – November 13, 2010), appointed Archbishop of Bobo-Dioulasso
 Bishop Jean-Marie Untaani Compaoré (June 15, 1979  – June 10, 1995), appointed Archbishop of Ouagadougou
 Bishop Marcel Chauvin, C.SS.R. (June 16, 1964  – June 15, 1979)
 Prefects Apostolic of Fada N’Gourma (Roman rite)
 Fr. Alphonse Chantoux, C.SS.R. (May 29, 1959  – June 16, 1964)

See also
Roman Catholicism in Burkina Faso

References

External links
 GCatholic.org

Fada N'Gourma
Christian organizations established in 1959
Roman Catholic dioceses and prelatures established in the 20th century
Fada N'Gourma, Roman Catholic Diocese of